The 2012 season of the Torneio Nacional Interprovincial is the second edition of the third tier of the Bolivian Football pyramid. In this edition will comprise the champions of the nine provincial championship and the host team from Tarija. The host cities are Yacuíba and Bermejo. The winners will be promoted to the 2012–13 Liga Nacional B, while the second place will compete in Copa Bolivia.

Teams

Group stage

Group A
Standings

Round 1

Round 2

Round 3

Round 4

Round 5

Group B
Standings

Round 1

Round 2

Round 3

Round 4

Round 5

Semifinals

3rd Place Playoff

Final

References 

Torneo Nacional Interprovincial seasons
3